The Kawanishi E11K was a Japanese flying boat of the 1930s. It was designed as a night reconnaissance aircraft for the Imperial Japanese Navy, but was not accepted, the two aircraft built being used as transports as the Type 96 Transport Flying Boat during the Second World War.

Development and design
In 1936 the Imperial Japanese Navy drew up a requirement for an aircraft to replace the Aichi Type 96 Reconnaissance Seaplane as a specialised night reconnaissance aircraft, intended to spot naval gunfire in night actions and to shadow enemy forces at night, allowing submarines to be directed to targets. The requirement was passed to Aichi and Kawanishi, with both companies producing aircraft to meet the navy's needs. While Aichi produced a biplane similar to the aircraft that was to be replaced, Kawanishi designed a gull winged cantilever monoplane. It was powered by a single pusher Hiro Type 91 w engine strut mounted above the wing driving a four-bladed propeller, with its radiator mounted in a fairing above the rear fuselage so that it was located in the propeller's slipstream. It was fitted with retractable wingtip floats, while its wings folded to aid storage aboard the cruisers of the Japanese Navy.

The first of two prototypes of Kawanishi's design, the Experimental 11-Shi Special Reconnaissance Seaplane, with the short designation E11K, made its maiden flight on 11 June 1937. It proved to have poor stability and water handling, while the engine installation overheated. It was unsuitable for the night reconnaissance role, with the Aichi design proving generally superior and being ordered into production as the Aichi E11A.

Operational history
The two prototypes were fitted with retractable beaching gear, in order to serve as a utility transport aircraft, and was accepted into service by the Japanese Navy as the Type 96 Transport. These aircraft were used as liaison aircraft for reconnaissance seaplane squadrons and remained in use well into the Second World War.

Specifications

See also

Footnotes
 In the Japanese Navy designation system, specifications were given a Shi number based on the year of the Emperor's reign it was issued.  In this case 11-Shi stood for 1936, the 11th year of the Shōwa era.
  Kawanishi had made a similar modification to its earlier Kawanishi E10K, which had lost out to the Aichi E10A, producing the Navy Type 94 Transport.

References

Notes

Bibliography

 
 

E11K, Kawanishi
Flying boats
E11K
Single-engined pusher aircraft
High-wing aircraft
Aircraft first flown in 1937